Rangitoto Lighthouse (also called Rangitoto Beacon) is a lighthouse off the coast in McKenzie Bay, in Auckland's Hauraki Gulf.

The lighthouse was built in 1882.  In 1905 a light was added for nighttime visibility.

Although not classed officially as a lighthouse by the New Zealand MSA, it does currently flash red every 12 seconds (also known as its character) and can be seen clearly from the southernmost of North Harbour's East Coast Bays.

The beacon is red and white in colour, stands at 21 metres tall, and continues to run through solar power.  The height of the focal plane is 69 ft or 21 m.

See also 

 List of lighthouses in New Zealand

References

External links 
 
 Lighthouses of New Zealand Maritime New Zealand

Lighthouses completed in 1882
Lighthouses in New Zealand
Hauraki Gulf
Transport buildings and structures in the Auckland Region